Bayer 04 Leverkusen II was the reserve team of German football club Bayer 04 Leverkusen. Until 2005, the team played as Bayer 04 Leverkusen Amateure. 

The team has qualified for the DFB-Pokal, the German Cup, on eight occasions, but never advanced beyond the first round. Before being withdrawn from competition at the end of the 2013–14 season the team played in the tier four Regionalliga West.

History
Bayer 04 Leverkusen Amateure first entered the highest football league in the Middle Rhine region, the Verbandsliga Mittelrhein, in 1978 and won the league in its fourth season there, in 1981. The team spent the next seventeen seasons in the tier-three Oberliga Nordrhein, gradually improving its results. In 1994 the Regionalliga was established as the new third tier of German football and the team won promotion to this level after an Oberliga championship in 1998.

Bayer Leverkusen Amateure became a yo-yo team between the Regionalliga and Oberliga, winning promotion to the former in 1998, 2001 and 2005 but suffering relegation again each time, in 2000, 2003 and 2007. It became a more permanent member of the Regionalliga when the Oberliga Nordrhein was disbanded in 2008 and the Regionalliga West established, with the team entering the latter league.

The team spent its last six seasons from 2008 to 2014 in the tier-four Regionalliga West, where its best result was an eighth place in its last season there.

The team also qualified for the DFB-Pokal eight times, in 1981–82, 1989–90, 1992–93, 1996–97, 1998–99, 2000–01, 2003–04 and 2007–08, but never advanced past the first round.

In 2014 a change in the regulations by the Deutsche Fußball Liga regarding reserve teams meant that such sides, in the form of under-23 teams, were not compulsory anymore for Bundesliga and 2nd Bundesliga clubs. Following this change, some reserve teams were withdrawn from competition, among them Eintracht Frankfurt II, FSV Frankfurt II and Bayer 04 Leverkusen II. Bayer 04 Leverkusen had requested the change as it did not see much potential for reserve team players in the Regionalliga to break through to the Bundesliga side and wanted to focus on its under-17 and under-19 sides instead and to loan out young players.

Honours
The team's honours:
Oberliga Nordrhein
 Champions: (3) 1998, 2001, 2005
 Runners-up: 2008
Verbandsliga Mittelrhein
 Champions: 1981
Middle Rhine Cup
 Winners: (5) 1996, 1998, 2000, 2003, 2007

Recent seasons 
The recent season-by-season performance of the club:

 With the introduction of the Regionalligas in 1994 and the 3. Liga in 2008 as the new third tier, below the 2. Bundesliga, all leagues below dropped one tier. In 2000 all clubs from the disbanded Regionalliga West/Südwest from North Rhine-Westphalia joint the Regionalliga Nord, in 2008 these clubs left the league again to join the new Regionalliga West.

Stadium
The team used to play their home game at Ulrich-Haberland-Stadion, Platz 11, next to the club's main stadium, with a capacity of 3,200.

Players

Squad

References

External links
 Official club website 
 Bayer 04 Leverkusen II at Weltfussball.de 

Bayer 04 Leverkusen
North Rhine-Westphalia reserve football teams
German reserve football teams
Association football clubs disestablished in 2014